Fernando Enrique Astengo Sánchez (born 8 January 1960) is a former footballer and current manager.

Career
During his years as footballer he played as centre back, position which was well considered after being featured in 1988's America Ideal Team. Despite his success, in 1989, Astengo was involved in Chile national team scandal at Maracanã, which alongside keeper Roberto Rojas and his coach :Orlando Aravena received a five-year ban by the FIFA.

He began his career with Colo-Colo lower divisions, later having a brief spell as first-team caretaker coach in 2008, replacing Claudio Borghi. However, he left the Pedreros–based team and then had short periods at Unión San Felipe youth ranks in 2009, and Deportes Temuco in 2013.

Other works
In addition, he has worked for the digital media Radio TouchTV.

Honours

As Player

Club
Colo-Colo
 Primera División (1): 1986

Grêmio
 Copa do Brasil (1): 1989
 Campeonato Gaúcho (3): 1987, 1988, 1989

Individual
 1988 America Ideal Team

As Manager

Club
Colo-Colo
 Torneo Apertura (1): Runner-up 2008

References

External links
 

1960 births
Living people
Footballers from Santiago
Chilean footballers
Unión Española footballers
Rangers de Talca footballers
Colo-Colo footballers
Grêmio Foot-Ball Porto Alegrense players
Audax Italiano footballers
Chilean Primera División players
Primera B de Chile players
Campeonato Brasileiro Série A players
Chilean expatriate footballers
Expatriate footballers in Brazil
Chilean expatriate sportspeople in Brazil
Chile international footballers
1987 Copa América players
1989 Copa América players
Association football controversies
Association football defenders
Chilean football managers
Colo-Colo managers
Deportes Temuco managers
Chilean Primera División managers
Primera B de Chile managers
Chilean association football commentators
Canal del Fútbol color commentators